Rebel is a 2022 drama film written and directed by Adil El Arbi and Bilall Fallah. The film stars Aboubakr Bensaihi, Lubna Azabal, Amir El Arbi, Tara Abboud, and Younes Bouab. It focuses on the portrayal of a Muslim family torn apart over the future of its youngest member.

The film had its world premiere at the 2022 Cannes Film Festival on 26 May 2022, and was released in France on 31 August 2022, and in Belgium on 5 October 2022, by BAC Films and Wild Bunch. At the 12th Magritte Awards, Rebel received four nominations, including Best Actor and Best Actress for Bensaihi and Azabal, respectively.

Plot 
Kamal Wasaki is a young Belgian rapper of Moroccan origin. He decided to go to Raqqa in Syria as a volunteer to help the victims of the war. His family stayed in Molenbeek. Nassim, Kamal's younger brother, was very influenced by his older brother and wanted to join him. The youngster is then approached by an Islamic State recruiter. Leïla, Kamal and Nassim's mother, tries to save her young son. Kamal, on the other hand, is caught in the middle of a conflict and has to join an armed group against his will.

Cast
 Aboubakr Bensaihi as Kamal Wasaki
 Lubna Azabal as Leila Wasaki
 Amir El Arbi as Nassim Wasaki
 Tara Abboud as Noor
 Younes Bouab as Abu Amar

Accolades

References

External links
 

2022 films
2022 drama films
2020s Arabic-language films
2020s French films
2020s French-language films
Belgian drama films
Belgian multilingual films
Films about Islam
Films directed by Adil El Arbi and Bilall Fallah
French drama films
French multilingual films
French-language Belgian films
French-language Luxembourgian films
Luxembourgian drama films
Luxembourgian multilingual films